Death of Me may refer to:

 Death of Me (film), 2020 horror film
 "Death of Me" (Red song), a 2008 song on Red's on album Innocence & Instinct
 The Death of Me (Ahmad album), 2010
 The Death of Me, a 2020 album by Australian metalcore band Polaris
 The Death of Me (City and Colour EP), 2004
 "The Death of Me" (Asking Alexandria song), a song by Asking Alexandria's 2013 album From Death to Destiny